The Kōmos (pl. kōmoi) was a ritualistic drunken procession performed by revelers in ancient Greece, whose participants were known as komasts (κωμασταί, kōmastaí). Its precise nature has been difficult to reconstruct from the diverse literary sources and evidence derived from vase painting. 

The earliest reference to the komos is in Hesiod's Shield of Herakles, which indicates it took place as part of wedding festivities (line 281). And famously Alcibiades gate-crashes the Symposium while carousing in a komos. However, no one kind of event is associated with the komos: Pindar describes them taking place at the city festivals (Pythian 5.21, 8.20, Olympian 4.9), while Demosthenes mentions them taking place after the pompe and choregoi on the first day of the Greater Dionysia (Speeches 21.10), which may indicate the komos might have been a competitive event.

The komos must be distinguished from the pompe, or ritual procession, and the chorus, both of which were scripted. The komos lacked a chorus leader, script, or rehearsal. In the performance of Greek victory odes (epinikia) at post-Game celebrations for winning athletes, the choral singers often present themselves as komasts, or extend an invitation to join the komos, as if the formal song were a preliminary to spontaneous revelry.  Nevertheless some komoi were expressly described as "semnoí" ("modest", "decent"), which implies that standard komoi were anything but.

Demosthenes upbraids the brother-in-law of Aeschines for not wearing a mask during the komos, as was the custom (On the Embassy 19.287), suggesting costume or disguise may have been involved. The playing of music during the komos is also mentioned by Aristophanes (Thesmophoriazusae 104, 988) and Pindar (Olympian 4.9, Pythian 5.22). There are also depictions of torch-lit processions in vase painting, yet it is not always clear from the evidence of vases if they depict symposia, choruses or komoi.

It is now widely thought that komos and κωμῳδία - komoidia "comedy" are etymologically related, the derivation being komos + ᾠδή - o(i)de "song" (from ἀείδω - aeido "sing"). However, in part III of the Poetics, Aristotle records the tradition  that the word komoedia derives from the Megaran mime that took place in the villages of Sicily, hence from κώμη - kome (the Dorian word for village). Nevertheless, it remains unclear exactly how the revel-song developed into the Greek Old comedy of the Dionysian festival in the 6th century BC.

See also
 Corpus vasorum antiquorum

Notes

References

Kenneth S. Rothwell Jr. ‘’Nature, Culture and the Origins of Greek Comedy: A Study of Animal Choruses’’. CUP 2006.

Ancient Greek comedy
Cult of Dionysus